WRWH (1350 AM) is a radio station broadcasting a News Talk Information format. Licensed to Cleveland, Georgia, United States.  The station is currently owned by White County Media, LLC. and features programming from Fox News Radio., Local high school sports, University of Georgia Bulldogs Sports,  local community events, and 60's, 70's, and 80's music.

References

The all new WRWH Cleveland Ga (93.9FM)
https://fccdata.org/?facid=200991

External links

RWH
White County, Georgia